The 1963 Louisville Cardinals football team was an American football team that represented the University of Louisville in the Missouri Valley Conference (MVC) during the 1963 NCAA University Division football season. In their 18th season under head coach Frank Camp, the Cardinals compiled a 3–7 record (0–3 against conference opponents) and were outscored by a total of 213 to 118.

The team's statistical leaders included Tom LaFramboise	 with 1,205 passing yards, Larry Compton with 199 rushing yards, Charlie Mudd with 367 receiving yards, and LaFramboise and Mudd with 26 points each.

Schedule

References

Louisville
Louisville Cardinals football seasons
Louisville Cardinals football